The Manpack Loudspeaker Version IV (MLX4) is a military loudspeaker. It was developed and operated by the Civil Military Operations Group (CMOG) of the Philippine Army for information support affairs operations.

History
The equipment was used by the CMOG at the Zamboanga City crisis of 2013 where it was used to broadcast to Moro National Liberation Front members the procedure for surrendering to government forces. It was also used to broadcast military songs to boost the morale of government troops in the operation.

The MLX4 was also used in the same year as part of the AFP's Disaster Response Operations following the onslaught of Typhoon Haiyan (Yolanda). The equipment was used to relay messages to victims seeking to receive relief goods as well as provide moral support by playing Christmas and other inspirational songs in December of that year.

Variants

 MLX-4
 MLX-5
 MLX-6
 MLX-7 - Reduced weight (14kg), increased battery life and increased effective range compared to previous versions. Introduced in 2021.

Images

References

Military radio systems of the Philippines
Information operations and warfare